John Ducey  was an Irish Anglican priest in the  17th century: the Archdeacon of Ardfert from 1625 to 1628.

References

17th-century Irish Anglican priests
Archdeacons of Ardfert